Michalis Zaropoulos (born 12 July 1991) is a Greek professional footballer who plays as a goalkeeper for Football League club Trikala.

Career

Trikala
On 27 June 2019, Zaropoulos joined Trikala on a 1-year deal.

References

External links
Uefa.com

Living people
1991 births
Greek footballers
Association football goalkeepers
Super League Greece players
Xanthi F.C. players
Kalamata F.C. players
Apollon Smyrnis F.C. players
Trikala F.C. players
Footballers from Trikala